Agoseris hirsuta is a North American species of flowering plants in the family Asteraceae known by the common name Coast Range agoseris or woolly goat chicory. It grows only in the Coast Ranges along the Pacific coast of California, from Humboldt County to San Luis Obispo County.

Description
Agoseris hirsuta resembles  the common dandelion (Taraxacum officinale) in having no leafy stems, only a rosette of leaves close to the ground. There is a single flower head with many yellow ray florets but no disc florets.

References

External links
Calphotos photos gallery, University of California

hirsuta
Endemic flora of California
Natural history of the California chaparral and woodlands
Natural history of the California Coast Ranges
Natural history of the San Francisco Bay Area
Plants described in 1899
Taxa named by Edward Lee Greene
Taxa named by William Jackson Hooker
Flora without expected TNC conservation status